Winter Song(s) or The Winter Song may refer to:

Literature
 Winter Song, a 1992 book of poems by Georgina Battiscombe
 Winter Song, a novel by Roberta Gellis
 Winter Song, a 1950 novel by James Hanley
 Žiemos daina (English: Winter song), a poem suite by Henrikas Radauskas

Music
 Winter's song, from Shakespeare's play Love's Labour's Lost

Albums
 Winter Song (John Tesh album)
 Wintersong, by Sarah McLachlan
 Wintersong (Paul Winter album)
 Winter Song (EP), by Wizz Jones
 Winter Songs (Art Bears album)
 Winter Songs (Ronan Keating album)
 Winter Songs (EP), by Matt Pond PA
 Halford III: Winter Songs, by Halford
 Winter Songs, by Anúna
 Winter Songs, by Ola Gjeilo and Choir of Royal Holloway

Songs
 "Winter Song" (Chris Rea song), 1991
 "Winter Song" (Sara Bareilles and Ingrid Michaelson song), 2008
 "Winter Song", by Caesars from Paper Tigers
 "Winter Song", by Crash Test Dummies from The Ghosts That Haunt Me
 "Winter Song", by Dreams Come True
 "Winter Song", by Harry Chapin from Sniper and Other Love Songs
 "Winter Song", by Lindisfarne from Nicely Out of Tune
 "Winter Song", by Loudon Wainwright III from Album II
 "Winter Song", by Mark Olson from The Salvation Blues
 "Winter Song", by Nico from Chelsea Girl
 "Winter Song", by Screaming Trees from Sweet Oblivion
 "Winter Song", by Yoko Ono from Approximately Infinite Universe
 "Winter Song", a folk song recorded by Rosalie Sorrels
 "Winter's Song", by Cowboy Junkies from Black Eyed Man
 "The Winter Song", by Au Revoir Simone from Verses of Comfort, Assurance & Salvation
 "The Winter Song", by Angel from White Hot

See also
 Christmas carol